The Travuniidae are a small family of harvestman with little more than ten described species, within the suborder Laniatores.

Description
Travuniidae are at the most three millimeters long, with slender, unarmed legs and robust, strongly spined pedipalps.

Distribution
Travuniidae have been found in Europe, Japan and the United States. Although some were described from Slovenia, these records proved to be erroneous.

Relationships
Travuniidae are most closely related to Cladonychiidae; it is even possible that Travuniidae is paraphyletic in respect to this family.

Name
The name of the type genus is derived from the Latin name of Trebinje, Bosnia and Herzegovina.

Species

Peltonychiinae

 Peltonychia Roewer, 1935
 Peltonychia leprieurii (Lucas, 1860) — Buco Dell'Orso (cave, northern Italy)
 Peltonychia posteumicola (Roewer, 1935)
 Peltonychia gabria Roewer, 1935
 Peltonychia tenuis Roewer, 1935

Travuniinae

 Abasola Strand, 1928
 Abasola troglodytes (Roewer, 1915) — Dalmatia
 Abasola sarea Roewer, 1935 — Pyrenees
 Abasola hofferi Silhavy, 1937 — Yugoslavia

 Arbasus Roewer, 1935
 Arbasus caecus (Simon, 1911) — southern France

 Dinaria Hadzi, 1932 — palearctic
 Kratochvíliola Roewer, 1935 — palearctic
 Kratochvíliola navarica Roewer, 1935

 Speleonychia Briggs, 1974
 Speleonychia sengeri Briggs, 1974 — Washington

 Travunia Absolon & Kratochvíl, 1932
 Travunia jandai Kratochvíl, 1938 — Yugoslavia

incertae sedis

 Yuria Suzuki, 1964 — Japan
 Yuria pulcra Suzuki, 1964
 Yuria pulcra pulcra Suzuki, 1964
 Yuria pulcra briggsi Suzuki, 1975

 Buemarinoa Roewer, 1956
 Buemarinoa patrizii Roewer, 1956 — Sardinia

Footnotes

References
 's Biology Catalog: Travuniidae
  (eds.) (2007): Harvestmen - The Biology of Opiliones. Harvard University Press 

Harvestmen
Harvestman families